Nail clubbing, also known as digital clubbing or clubbing, is a deformity of the finger or toe nails associated with a number of diseases, mostly of the heart and lungs. When it occurs together with joint effusions, joint pains, and abnormal skin and bone growth it is known as hypertrophic osteoarthropathy.

Clubbing is associated with lung cancer, lung infections, interstitial lung disease, cystic fibrosis, or cardiovascular disease. Clubbing may also run in families, and occur unassociated with other medical problems.

The incidence of clubbing is unknown; it was present in about 1% of people admitted to an internal medicine unit of a hospital. Clubbing has been recognized as a sign of disease since the time of Hippocrates.

Causes
Clubbing is associated with
 Lung disease:
 Lung cancer
 Interstitial lung disease most commonly idiopathic pulmonary fibrosis
 Complicated tuberculosis
 Suppurative lung disease: lung abscess, empyema, bronchiectasis, cystic fibrosis
 Mesothelioma of the pleura
  Arteriovenous fistula or malformation
 Sarcoidosis
 Heart disease:
 Any disease featuring chronic hypoxia
 Congenital cyanotic heart disease (most common cardiac cause)
 Subacute bacterial endocarditis
 Atrial myxoma (benign tumor)
 Tetralogy of Fallot
 Gastrointestinal and hepatobiliary:
 Malabsorption
 Crohn's disease and ulcerative colitis
 Cirrhosis, especially in primary biliary cholangitis
 Hepatopulmonary syndrome, a complication of cirrhosis
 Others:
 Graves' disease (autoimmune hyperthyroidism) – in this case it is known as thyroid acropachy
 Familial and hereditary clubbing and "pseudoclubbing" (people of African descent often have what appears to be clubbing)
 Vascular anomalies of the affected arm such as an axillary artery aneurysm (in unilateral clubbing)

Nail clubbing is not specific to chronic obstructive pulmonary disease (COPD). Therefore, in patients with COPD and significant degrees of clubbing, a search for signs of bronchogenic carcinoma (or other causes of clubbing) might still be indicated. A congenital form has also been recognized.

Hypertrophic pulmonary osteoarthropathy

A special form of clubbing is hypertrophic pulmonary osteoarthropathy (HPOA), known in continental Europe as Pierre Marie-Bamberger syndrome. This is the combination of clubbing and thickening of periosteum (connective tissue lining of the bones) and synovium (lining of joints), and is often initially diagnosed as arthritis. It is commonly associated with lung cancer.

Primary hypertrophic osteoarthropathy
Primary hypertrophic osteoarthropathy is HPOA without signs of pulmonary disease. This form has a hereditary component, although subtle cardiac abnormalities can occasionally be found. It is known eponymously as the Touraine–Solente–Golé syndrome. This condition has been linked to mutations in the gene on the fourth chromosome (4q33-q34) coding for the enzyme 15-hydroxyprostaglandin dehydrogenase (HPGD); this leads to decreased breakdown of prostaglandin E2 and elevated levels of this substance.

Pathogenesis
The exact cause for sporadic clubbing is unknown. Theories as to its cause include:
 Vasodilation (i.e., distended blood vessels).
 Secretion of growth factors (e.g., platelet-derived growth factor and hepatocyte growth factor) from the lungs.
 Overproduction of prostaglandin E2 by other tissues.
 Increased entry of megakaryocytes into the systemic circulation. Under normal circumstances in healthy individuals, megakaryocytes that arise from the bone marrow are trapped in the pulmonary capillary bed and broken down before they enter the systemic circulation. It is thought that in disorders where there is right-to-left shunting or lung malignancy, the megakaryocytes can bypass the breakdown within the pulmonary circulation and enter the systemic circulation. They are then trapped within the capillary beds within the extremities, such as the digits, and release platelet-derived growth factor (PDGF) and vascular endothelial growth factor (VEGF). PDGF and VEGF have growth promoting properties and cause connective tissue hypertrophy and capillary permeability.

Diagnosis

When clubbing is observed, pseudoclubbing should be excluded before making the diagnosis. Associated conditions may be identified by taking a detailed medical history—particular attention is paid to lung, heart, and gastrointestinal conditions—and conducting a thorough clinical examination, which may disclose associated features relevant to the underlying diagnosis. Additional studies such as a chest X-ray and a chest CT-scan may reveal otherwise asymptomatic cardiopulmonary disease.

Stages
Clubbing is present in one of five stages:
 No visible clubbing - Fluctuation (increased ballotability) and softening of the nail bed only. No visible changes of nails.
 Mild clubbing - Loss of the normal <165° angle (Lovibond angle) between the nailbed and the fold (cuticula). Schamroth's window (see below) is obliterated. Clubbing is not obvious at a glance.
 Moderate clubbing - Increased convexity of the nail fold. Clubbing is apparent at a glance.
 Gross clubbing - Thickening of the whole distal (end part of the) finger (resembling a drumstick)
 Hypertrophic osteoarthropathy - Shiny aspect and striation of the nail and skin

Schamroth's sign or Schamroth's window test (originally demonstrated by South African cardiologist Leo Schamroth on himself) is a popular test for clubbing. When the distal phalanges (bones nearest the fingertips) of corresponding fingers of opposite hands are directly opposed (place fingernails of same finger on opposite hands against each other, nail to nail), a small diamond-shaped "window" is normally apparent between the nailbeds. If this window is obliterated, the test is positive and clubbing is present.

Epidemiology
The exact frequency of clubbing in the population is not known. A 2008 study found clubbing in 1%, or 15 patients, of 1511 patients admitted to a department of internal medicine in Belgium. Of these, 40%, or 6 patients, turned out to have significant underlying disease of various causes, while 60%, or 9 patients, had no medical problems on further investigations and remained well over the subsequent year.

History
At least since the time of Hippocrates, clubbing has been recognized as a sign of disease. The phenomenon has been called "Hippocratic fingers".

The Dutch painter Dick Ket had nail clubbing as is seen from his paintings. He had an underlying disease, probably dextrocardia.

See also
 Clubbed thumb (unrelated congenital deformity)

References

Conditions of the skin appendages
Symptoms and signs: musculoskeletal system